A selection of compositions using quarter tones:

A
Thomas Adès
Asyla calls for an upright piano tuned a quarter-tone flat.

B
Jan Bach
Concert Variations for solo euphonium; "each variation is based on different performance techniques of the instrument, including quarter-tones"
 Clarence Barlow
Çoǧluotobüsişletmesi for four pianos. "in which four of the 12 pitches of the chromatic scale are tuned a quarter tone flat"
...until''' version 7 for guitar (1980).
 
Concerto for Quarter Tone Piano and Quarter Tone Strings (1930)
 Béla Bartók
String Quartet No. 6; the third movement Burletta contains quarter-tone tuning used for parodistic effect. Quarter tones are also used in Bartók's ballet The Miraculous Mandarin.Sonata for Solo Violin; the fourth movement Presto contains quarter-tones, but they are not "structural features." This movement also calls for third-tones.
Violin Concerto No. 2; the cadenza in the final movement requires the use of quarter-tones, but only as an effect.
 John BeckwithBlurred Lines for violin and harpsichord (1997)
 Jack BehrensQuarter-Tone Quartet, Op. 20.
 Alban Berg
Chamber Concerto, for violin, piano, and 13 winds.
 Luciano BerioE vó (1972).
 Easley Blackwood Jr.Twelve Microtonal Etudes for Electronic Music Media: "24 Notes: Moderato" (1980).
 Ernest Bloch
Piano Quintet No. 1 (1923); the first movement features use of quarter-tones in the string parts.
 Pierre BoulezPolyphonie X (1951).Le Visage nuptial (1946).

C
 Jacob CollierIn the Bleak Midwinter for 10 Vocalists (2016)
 Julián CarrilloCapricho for piano in quarter-tones (1959)Capricho for solo viola in quarter-tones (1926)Casi-sonatas 1–6 for solo violin, viola or cello in quarter-tones (c.1960s)
Concertino in quarter-, eighth- and sixteenth-tones for violin, cello and harp with orchestra (1926)
Concerto for 1/4-tone and 1/8-tone cello and orchestra (1958)
Concerto No. 1 for quarter-tone violin and orchestra (1963)
Concerto No. 2 for quarter-tone violin and orchestra (1964)Mass for Pope John XXIII for male chorus in quarter-tones (1920s)Preludio a Colón for vocalizing soprano, octavina (modified bass guitar, in 8th tones), flute, 16th-tone harp, violin, and guitar (1922)Serenata for cello in quarter-tones with English horn, harp, and string quartet (1927)70 estudios for solo violin in quarter-tones (c. 1927?) {also for solo viola, cello, or double-bass}
Sonata for solo guitar in quarter-tones (c.1924)
Sonata (Amanecer en Berlin 13) for solo harp in quarter-tones (1931)Sonata casi fantasia for violin, violoncello and guitar in quarter-, eighth- and sixteenth-tones (1925)
String Quartet in quarter-tones (c.1924) {There are also 7 others with some using smaller intervals.}
Suite for solo guitar in quarter-tones (1960)3 estudios en forma de sonatina for solo violin in quarter-tones (1927)
Symphony No. 1 (Colombia) for orchestra in quarter-tones (c.1924)
Symphony No. 2 (Colombia) for orchestra in quarter-tones (1926)
 Aaron CoplandVitebsk (1928).
 John CoriglianoChiaroscuro for two pianos tuned a quarter tone apart (1997)
 Mildred CouperXanadu for two pianos tuned a quarter tone apart (ca. 1930)Dirge for two pianos tuned a quarter tone apart, published in New Music quarterly (January 1937)Rumba for two pianos tuned a quarter tone apart (ca. 1937)

D
 John DiercksReminiscences, 1971 for two pianos, one tuned a quarter-tone lower.

E
 John EatonSonority Movement, for flute and nine harps.
 Danny Elfman
Soundtrack score for A Simple Plan features "very specific quarter tone detunings coming off the Emulator".
 Don EllisElectric Bath George EnescuŒdipe (opera)
Third Violin Sonata ("In Popular Romanian Style")

F
 Bjørn FongaardGalaxe [Galaxy] (for three quarter-tone guitars), Opus 46.
 John Foulds
 Cello Sonata (1905, rev. 1927), passages in the second movement

G
 Sofia GubaidulinaQuaternion for cello quartet, two of the cellos are tuned down a quarter toneMusic for Flute, Strings, and Percussion, the strings are divided into two sections, one of which is tuned a quarter-tone lower than the other.

H
 Sampo HaapamäkiVelinikka, concerto for quarter-tone accordion (2008)Conception, double concerto for quarter-tone guitar, quarter-tone accordion and orchestra (2012)
 Quarter-Tone Piano Concerto (2017)
 Georg Friedrich Haas3 Hommages, for piano player on two pianos tuned a quarter tone apart
"Hommage à Steve Reich" (1982)
"Hommage à György Ligeti" (1984)
"Hommage à Josef Matthias Hauer" (1982)
 Alois HábaChildren's Play for unaccompanied youth chorus, Op.43 (1932)Chor-Suite for unaccompanied chorus, Op. 13 (1922)5 Choruses for unaccompanied youth chorus, Op. 42 (1932)5 Mixed Choruses, Op. 44 (1932)Detské nálady (Children's Moods), 8-song cycle for mid-ranged voice and quartertone guitar, Op.51 (1943)
Fantasy No. 1 for quartertone piano, Op. 17 (1923)
Fantasy No. 2 for quartertone piano, Op. 19 (1924)
Fantasy No. 3 for quartertone piano, Op. 20 (1924)
Fantasy No. 4 for quartertone piano, Op. 25 (1925)
Fantasy No. 5 for quartertone piano, Op. 26 (1925)
Fantasy No. 6 for quartertone piano, Op. 27 (1926)
Fantasy No. 7 for quartertone piano, Op. 28 (1926)
Fantasy No. 8 for quartertone piano, Op. 29 (1926)
Fantasy No. 9 for quartertone piano, Op. 30 (1926)
Fantasy No. 10 for quartertone piano, Op. 31 (1926)
Fantasy No. 11 for quartertone piano, Op. 89 (1959)
Fantasy for unaccompanied violin, Op. 9a (1921)
Fantasy for unaccompanied violoncello, Op. 18 (1924)
Fantasy for violin and quartertone piano, Op. 21 (1925)
Fantasy for viola and quartertone piano, Op. 32 (1926)
Fantasy for violoncello and quartertone piano, Op. 33 (1927)Já (I) for unaccompanied men's chorus, Op. 36 (1928)Matka (The Mother), quartertone opera in 10 scenes, Op. 35 (1927–29)Poesie zivota (Poetry of Life), 12-song cycle for soprano and quartertone guitar, Op. 53 (1943)Pracující den (The working day) for unaccompanied male voices, Op. 45 (1932)
Solo for violin Op. 93 (1961–62)
Sonata for quartertone piano, Op. 62 (1946–47)
String Quartet No. 2 ("In quarter-tone system"), Op. 7 (1920)
String Quartet 3 ("In quarter-tone system"), Op. 12 (1922)
String Quartet 4 ("In quarter-tone system"), Op. 14 (1922)
String Quartet 6 ("In quarter-tone system"), Op. 70 (1950)
String Quartet No. 12 ("In quarter-tone system"), Op. 90 (1959–60)
String Quartet 14 ("In quarter-tone system"), Op. 94 (1963)
Suite No. 1 for quartertone piano, Op. 10 (1922, revised in 1932 as Op. 11a)
Suite No. 2 for quartertone piano, Op. 11 (1922, revised in 1932 as Op. 11b)
Suite No. 3 for quartertone piano, Op. 16 (1923)
Suite No. 4 for quartertone piano, Op. 22 (1924)
Suite No. 5 for quartertone piano, Op. 23 (1925)
Suite No. 6 for quartertone piano, Op. 88 (1957–59)
Suite for clarinet and quartertone piano, Op. 24 (1925)
1st Suite for quartertone guitar, Op. 54 (1943)
2nd Suite for quartertone guitar, Op. 63 (1947)
Suite for clarinet (unaccompanied), Op. 55 (1943)
Suite for quartertone trumpet and trombone, Op. 56 (1944)
Suite in quartertones for 4 trombones, Op. 72 (1950)
 Fromental HalévyProméthée enchaîné (1849)
 Jonathan HarveyValley of Aosta for chamber ensemble of 13 players and electronics (1988)
 Lejaren Hiller
String Quartet No. 5 (1962).
 Alan HovhanessO Lord, Bless Thy Mountains, Op. 276, for two pianos tuned a quarter tone apart (1974)

I
 Charles Ives
Three Quarter-Tone Pieces, for two pianos, one tuned a quarter-tone sharp, S. 128 (K. 3C3) (1923–24)Symphony No. 4 (1910–1924)

K
 Jeronimas Kačinskas
String Quartet No. 2 (1931) (lost? withdrawn?)
Trio for trumpet, viola, and harmonium (1933) 
 Gideon Klein
Duo for violin and viola in the Quartertone System (1940)

L
 Michael A. LevineDivination by Mirrors for Saw and Strings. Strings are divided into two groups of 13 tuned 1/4 step apart. Each group plays only in its own pitch "universe". The featured bowed saw freely moves from standard tuning to pitches a 1/4 step away. Premiered at Merkin Concert Hall, New York City, 1998 by the New York Virtuosi and Dale Stuckenbruck saw soloist.
 György LigetiClocks and Clouds for 12-voiced women's choir and orchestra.
Quartet No. 2 for strings.Ramifications for 12 solo strings (1968–69), divided into two groups tuned a quarter-tone apart.
 Arthur LouriéPrelude for piano "with higher chromatism", Op.12 No.2 (1912).
 Alain LouvierAnneaux de Lumière (1983) for two pianos, one tuned a quarter-tone apart (1 player)

M
 Street Cries (11.10.83) for solo Bb clarinet features extensive use of quarter tones in all three movements.
 Henry Mancini
Soundtrack score for Wait Until Dark (1967) features extensive use of quarter-tones including two pianos tuned a quarter-tone apartThe Night Visitor Steve MackeyIndigenous InstrumentsOn All Fours Andrew MarchAeolian Rustling (2001) for alto flute (Boehm system) and harp, with Kingma System alto flute ossia.XXIX—in Perpetuum (2001) for solo Kingma System quarter-tone alto flute.Water Lilies (2001) for solo alto flute and harp, with Kingma System quarter-tone alto flute ossia.Memoriam (2002) for Kingma System quarter-tone alto flute, vibraphone, marimba, harp and strings.
 Rytis MažulisQuartertone Canon for two piano tuned a quarter-tone apart (2010)Sans Pause for string quartet (2001)
 Olivier MessiaenDeux monodies en quarts de ton (1938).

N
 Per Nørgård
String Quartet No. 5 'Inscape' (1969)

O
 Frank J. OteriCircles Mostly in Wood, a quarter-tone wind quintet in five movements (2002)Fair and Balanced, a quarter-tone saxophone quartet in four short movements (2004)

P
 Krzysztof PendereckiThrenody to the Victims of Hiroshima, for string orchestra, frequently makes use of quarter tones.

R
 Karel Reiner
Fantasy for quarter-tone piano (1935-36)
Five songs for voice with violin accompaniment in quarter-tones to texts by Karel Hynek Mácha (1936, performed at the 1938 ISCM Festival in Paris)
3 Duos for 2 quarter-tone clarinets (1972)
Suite for quarter-tone piano (1935-36)
 Milan Ristić
Duo for violin and violoncello, Op. 11 (1938)
Septet for clarinet, 2 trombones, string trio, and doublebass, Op. 9 (1938)
Suite for unaccompanied violin, Op. 6 (1938)
Suite for ten strings, Op. 10 (1938)
Suite for four trombones, Op. 8 (1938, scheduled for performance during the 1939 ISCM Festival in Warsaw but the performance could not take place)

S
 Ezra Sims
 String Quartet No. 3 (1962)
 Richard SteinZwei Konzertstücke, Op. 26, 1906.
 Karlheinz StockhausenPietà, for soprano, quarter-tone flugelhorn, and electronic music, from the opera Dienstag aus LichtSchlagquartett, for piano and 3 x 2 timpani (1952)
 Billy StrangeThese Boots Are Made for Walkin', 1966 popular song, sung by Nancy Sinatra, with a prominent quarter tone double bass riff.

T
 Tōru TakemitsuBryce (1976).
 James TenneyBridge for two pianos tuned a quarter-tone apart (1984)
 Jukka TiensuuKymmari for Decacorde (2016)Anomal Dances Concerto for quarter-tone accordion and orchestra (2015)Kuuhiomo a proludi in quarter tones for any ensemble of melody instruments (2015)Arsenic and Old Lace for micro-tonally tuned harpsichord, string quartet (1990)Narcissus for oboe and tape (1979)
 Tui St. George TuckerAmoroso for solo clarinetIndian Summer for 2 baritones with 2 flutes, clarinet, bassoon, trombone, viola, and percussionLittle Pieces for quarter-tone pianoMy Melancholy Baby Fantasy for one player performing on two pianos at a right angle tuned a quarter-tone apartQuartertone Carol for recorder trioQuartertone Recorder DuetsQuartertone Lullubies 1–3 for recorder trioRomanza for solo recorder.Sarabande: Dance for Miriam Cooper, for microtonal harpsichord (1986)
Sonata No. 1 for Solo Recorder ("The Bullfinch").

W
 Ivan WyschnegradskyAinsi Parlait Zarathoustra, for four pianos two of which are tuned a quarter-tone sharp, Op. 17 (1929–1930, revised 1936)2 Chants sur Nietzsche, for baritone & 2 pianos in quarter tones, Op. 9 (1923)Chant douloureux et étude, for violin and piano, Op. 6 (1918)Composition, for string quartet, Op. 43 (1960)Cosmos, for 4 pianos in quarter tones, Op. 28 (1939–1940)Dialogue, for two pianos tuned a quarter-tone apart, eight hands, W.o.O. (1959)Dithyrambe, for two pianos tuned a quarter-tone apart, Op. 12 (1923–1924)Études sur les mouvements rotatoires, for two pianos tuned a quarter-tone apart, eight hands, Op. 45a.; for chamber orchestra, Op. 45c (1961)Études sur les densités et les volumes, for two pianos tuned a quarter-tone apart, Op. 39b (1956)Fragment symphonique No. 1, for four pianos two of which are tuned a quarter-tone sharp, Op. 23a; for orchestra, Op. 23c (1934, orch. vers. 1967)Fragment symphonique No. 2, for four pianos two of which are tuned a quarter-tone sharp, timpani & percussions, Op. 24 (1937)Fragment symphonique No. 3, for four pianos two of which are tuned a quarter-tone sharp & ad. lib. percussions, Op. 31 (1946)Prélude et Fugue, Op. 21, for two pianos tuned a quarter-tone apart (1932)Préludes dans tous les tons de l'échelle chromatique diatonisée à 13 sons, Op. 22, for two pianos tuned a quarter-tone apart (1934, revised 1960)
String Quartet No. 1, Op. 13 (1923–1924)
String Quartet No. 2, Op. 18 (1930–1931)
String Trio, Op. 53 (1979, unfinished, completed by Claude Ballif)Variations sans thème et conclusion (five), for orchestra, Op. 33 (1951–52)

Y
Eugène YsaÿeSix Sonatas for Solo Violin, Op. 27 (1924), Nos. 3 and 5

See also
List of compositions in just intonation

Notes

References

 
 
 
 
 
 
 
 
 
 
 
 
 
 
 
 
 
 
 
 
 
 
 

 
 
 
 
 
 
 
 
 
 
 
 
 
 
 
 
 
 
 
 
 
 
 
 
 
 
 
 
 
 
 
 
 
 

Further reading
 Gann, Kyle. 6 July 1999. "Sound Bytes of Truth", The Village Voice''.

Quarter tone pieces